Wendeburg is a municipality in the district of Peine, in Lower Saxony, Germany. It is situated approximately 11 km east of Peine, and 12 km northwest of Braunschweig.

Municipal subdivisions 
 Bortfeld
 Harvesse
 Meerdorf
 Neubrück and Ersehof
 Rüper
 Sophiental
 Wendeburg, Wendezelle and Zweidorf
 Wense

Personalities of the community 

 Heinrich Brandes (1803-1868), painter, born in the district of Bortfeld
 Carl Heinrich Theodor Knorr (1800-1875), founder of the food company Knorr, born in the district of Meerdorf
 Gerhard Schrader (1903-1990), chemist, born in the district of Bortfeld

External links

References 

Peine (district)